Eloi Amagat Arimany (born 21 May 1985), known simply as Eloi, is a Spanish professional footballer who plays as an attacking midfielder for UE Olot.

Club career

Girona
Born in Girona, Catalonia, Eloi began his career with his hometown side Girona FC, being loaned to neighbouring FC Palafrugell and CF Gavà for two of the following three seasons. In the summer of 2008, after helping his parent club to promote to Segunda División for the first time in 49 years, he joined Lorca Deportiva CF also in the Segunda División B, meeting the opposite fate.

In November 2009, Eloi signed for UE Llagostera in the Tercera División. He scored eight goals in his second year, and his team reached the third tier for the first time ever.

Eloi returned to Girona and division two on 5 July 2012, on a one-year contract with an option to a further season. He made his debut in the competition on 18 August, against neighbours CE Sabadell FC. He scored his first goal in the league the following weekend, playing five minutes and contributing to a 5–1 away rout of CD Guadalajara.

Eloi appeared in 16 matches in the 2016–17 campaign, as the Estadi Montilivi-based club promoted to La Liga for the first time in its history. He made his debut in the Spanish top flight on 16 February 2018 at the age of 32, coming on as a late substitute in the 3–0 home win over CD Leganés.

New York City
On 25 July 2018, Eloi moved abroad for the first time in his career, joining New York City FC. He made his debut in the Major League Soccer on 22 August, being one of two players sent off for the hosts in a 1–1 home draw with the New York Red Bulls.

Later career
Eloi returned to his homeland on 31 January 2019, agreeing to a deal at third-division UE Olot.

References

External links

La Segunda B profile 

1985 births
Living people
Sportspeople from Girona
Spanish footballers
Footballers from Catalonia
Association football midfielders
La Liga players
Segunda División players
Segunda División B players
Tercera División players
Segunda Federación players
Tercera Federación players
Girona FC players
CF Gavà players
Lorca Deportiva CF footballers
UE Costa Brava players
UE Olot players
Major League Soccer players
New York City FC players
Spanish expatriate footballers
Expatriate soccer players in the United States
Spanish expatriate sportspeople in the United States